was a Japanese photographer.

References

Japanese photographers
1910 births
1991 deaths